The Agulhas Passage is an abyssal channel located south of South Africa between the Agulhas Bank and Agulhas Plateau.

Geology

It is possible, however, that volcanic flows from the Agulhas Plateau large igneous province (LIP) added crustal material to the Agulhas Passage (which is 160-120 Ma) during the LIP formation (100-80 Ma) and that the crust under the passage was originally thinner.

The sedimentary layers are very thin in the western Agulhas Passage, in places only .  In the central parts of the passage, in contrast, they can reach  and form sediment drifts.  The southern part is affected by thinning and erosion.

Oceanography
The Agulhas Current, the western boundary current of the Indian Ocean, flows south through the Natal Valley, Transkei Basin, and Agulhas Passage into the south-east Atlantic Ocean where it retroflects back into the Indian Ocean as the Agulhas Return Current. In the Indian Ocean, the Agulhas Current is dissipated into a gyre which finally brings parts of the water mass back to the Natal Valley.

Since the development of the Antarctic Circumpolar Current in the Oligocene, Antarctic Bottom Water (AABW) flows both north through the Agulhas Passage and south of the Agulhas Plateau into the Transkei Basin and then into the Mozambique Basin.

North Atlantic Deep Water (NADW) flows north through the Agulhas Passage and then west of the Mozambique Ridge and through the Transkei Basin east of the ridge and then into the Indian Ocean.

Antarctic Intermediate Water flows from Antarctica into the Indian Ocean from where it reaches Africa from the east. It flows south through the Agulhas Passage and then follows the Agulhas Current and retroflects back into the Indian Ocean.

References

Notes

Sources

 
 
 
 

Landforms of the Indian Ocean